Clementia most commonly refers to the Roman goddess Clementia. It can also refer to:

People
 Clementia of Aquitaine (1048–1130), daughter of William VII, Duke of Aquitaine and Ermensinde de Longwy
 Clementia of Burgundy (c. 1078–c. 1133), countess of Flanders 
 Clementia of Zähringen (died 1175), daughter of Conrad I, Duke of Zähringen and Clementia of Namur
 Clementia of Catanzaro (fl. 1145–1179/81), countess of Catanzaro in the Kingdom of Sicily
 Clementia of Hungary (1293–1328), queen of France and Navarre

Other
 De Clementia, essay written in AD 55–56 by Seneca the Younger
 252 Clementina, large main belt asteroid discovered in 1885